Chosen is a 2016 British drama film directed by Jasmin Dizdar. Filming for the movie took place in Romania and New York State.

Synopsis
An unassuming young lawyer leads a fight against the Nazis near the end of the Second World War.

Cast

Main
 Luke Mably as Sonson
 Ana Ularu as Judith
 Tomasz Aleksander as Jeno
 Jordan Renzo as Robi
 Freddie Fuller as Zoltan
 Sam Churchill as Ezra
 Luke Jerdy as Efrahim

Supporting
 Julian Shatkin as Max
 Harvey Keitel as Papi
 Diana Cavallioti as Florence
 Paul Ipate as Aronson

Overview
The film is inspired by real events. It takes place in 1944 and is about a lawyer who fights Nazis during the Second World War. The Actor Harvey Keitel plays the lawyer in the present. The movie was shot in Bucharest, Romania, and Long Island, New York.  The screenplay is written by Gabriel de Mercur. Jasmin Dizdar directed it. It was produced by Michael Riley and co-produced by Tim Dennison. The film was published on DVD and shown on Video On Demand.

Reviews
Phil Hoad from The Guardian believes that the film is unfocused and only scratches the surface.

Isabelle Milton thinks that the movie shows the brutality the Hungarian Jews had to face towards the end of the Second World War, but has nothing new to offer. She also mentions that during the movie the soundtrack is played distractingly at inappropriate moments. Furthermore she thinks that the character development is thin.

Ryan Izay Reviews thinks that there are several screenplay problems in the movie like plot-holes, cliché bookend sequences and familiarity to the narrative. However she also thinks that it features enough competent filmmaking to forgive these kinds of mistakes.

References

External links
 
 

2010s war films
British war films
2016 films
Sterling Pictures films
World War II films based on actual events
2010s English-language films
2010s British films